Creely is a surname. Notable people with the surname include:

John V. Creely (1839–1900), American politician
Gus Creely  (1870–1934), American baseball player

See also
Robert Creeley, (1926–2005), American poet
Greely (disambiguation)